Anatoly Timofeyev (19 October 1887 – 17 August 1985) was a Russian fencer. He competed in the individual and team sabre events at the 1912 Summer Olympics.

References

External links
 

1887 births
1985 deaths
Russian male fencers
Olympic fencers of Russia
Fencers at the 1912 Summer Olympics